John Wilson Kahigwa (November 12, 1938 - March 14, 2012)  was an Anglican bishop in Uganda: he was Bishop of Kigezi from 1996 to 2004.

Kahigwa was educated at Uganda Christian University and ordained deacon in 1965 and priest in 1967.

References

20th-century Anglican bishops in Uganda
Anglican bishops of North Kigezi
21st-century Anglican bishops in Uganda
1938 births
Uganda Christian University alumni
2012 deaths